Al-Toqbah Club is a Saudi Arabian football team based in Khobar that play in the second tier of Saudi football, the Prince Mohammad bin Salman League.

Stadium 
Prince saud bin jalawi stadium.

Current squad

References

Thoqbah
Thoqbah
Thoqbah
Football clubs in Eastern Province, Saudi Arabia
Khobar